KPJN-LP (101.1 FM) was a radio station formerly licensed to serve Marshall, Arkansas. The station was owned by St. Therese Missionary Society. It aired a Catholic radio format. The station derived portions of its programming from the EWTN Global Radio Network and Starboard Broadcasting.

The station was assigned the KPJN-LP call letters by the Federal Communications Commission on March 19, 2003. On February 1, 2012, the station's license was cancelled and its call sign deleted by the FCC at the licensee's request.

References

External links
KPJN-LP official website
 

Defunct religious radio stations in the United States
PJN-LP
PJN-LP
Radio stations established in 2005
Searcy County, Arkansas
Radio stations disestablished in 2012
Defunct radio stations in the United States
2005 establishments in Arkansas
2012 disestablishments in Arkansas
PJN-LP